Brusque Futebol Clube, commonly referred to as Brusque, is a Brazilian professional club based in Brusque, Santa Catarina founded on 12 October 1987.

History
The club was founded on October 12, 1987, after Paysandu-SC and Carlos Renaux fused.

The club competed in the Campeonato Brasileiro Série C in 1988, being eliminated in the second stage. In 1989, Brusque competed in the Campeonato Brasileiro Série B, when the club was eliminated in the first stage. In 1992, Brusque won the Campeonato Catarinense, and the Copa Santa Catarina for the first time.

In 2008, Brusque won the Copa Santa Catarina for the second time, after beating Joinville in the final. The club also competed in the same season's Recopa Sul-Brasileira, which they won after beating Londrina after a penalty shootout in the semifinals, and defeating Atlético Sorocaba 2–0 in the final.

Stadium

The club usually plays its home games at Estádio Augusto Bauer, which is a stadium located in Brusque, and it has a maximum capacity of 5,000 people.

Current squad

Achievements
 Campeonato Brasileiro Série D:
 Winners (1): 2019
 Recopa Sul-Brasileira:
 Winners (1): 2008
 Campeonato Catarinense:
 Winners (2): 1992, 2022
 Copa Santa Catarina:
 Winners (5): 1992, 2008, 2010, 2018, 2019
 Recopa Catarinense:
 Winners (2): 2020, 2023
 Campeonato Catarinense Série B:
 Winners (3): 1997, 2008, 2015

References

Brusque Futebol Clube
Association football clubs established in 1987
Football clubs in Santa Catarina (state)
1987 establishments in Brazil
Campeonato Brasileiro Série D winners